The Bulgarian People's Macedonian-Adrianople Revolutionary Organization was a short-lived Bulgarian revolutionary organization from the region of Macedonia. It was created on May 4, 1910 by members of Secret Macedonian-Adrianople Revolutionary Organization's (SMARO) Solun, Strumica and Ser revolutionary regions, excluding the supporters of Yane Sandanski. A statute and a central committee, led by Hristo Chernopeev and Anton Bozukov, were created shortly after. Some of the other more renowned members of the organization were Tane Nikolov, Apostol Petkov, Georgi Zankov and Dimitar Lyapov. After negotiations in Sofia in 1911, BPMARO united with SMARO.

See also
Internal Macedonian Revolutionary Organisation

References

1910s in Bulgaria
Macedonia under the Ottoman Empire
Bulgarian revolutionary organisations
Internal Macedonian Revolutionary Organization
1910 establishments in the Ottoman Empire
Organizations established in 1910
Ottoman Thrace
Revolutionary organizations against the Ottoman Empire